Prevailing may refer to:

Prevailing winds
Prevailing visibility
Prevailing wage